Calabarzon, formally known as the Southern Tagalog Mainland, is an administrative region in the Philippines, designated as Region IV-A. The region comprises five provinces: Batangas, Cavite, Laguna, Quezon, and Rizal; and one highly urbanized city, Lucena. The region is the most populous region in the Philippines according to the Philippine Statistics Authority, having over 16.1 million inhabitants in 2020, and is also the country's second most densely populated after the National Capital Region.
The region is situated southeast of Metro Manila, and is bordered by Manila Bay to the west, Lamon Bay and the Bicol Region to the east, the Tayabas Bay and Sibuyan Sea to the south, and Central Luzon to the north. It is home to places like Mount Makiling near Los Baños, Laguna, and the Taal Volcano in Batangas.

Prior to its creation as a region, Calabarzon, together with the Mimaropa region, the province of Aurora and several parts of Metro Manila, formed the historical region known as Southern Tagalog, until they were separated in 2002 by virtue of Executive Order No. 103.

The history of the area known as Calabarzon dates back to early historic times.  Local historians believe that three of the tenth century place-names mentioned in the Philippines' earliest known written document, the Laguna Copperplate Inscription, pertain to regions or polities (Tagalog: "bayan") along the shores of Laguna Lake; and some Filipino-Chinese scholars believe the tenth century trading polity known as Ma-i may actually have been the predecessor of the present day town of Bay, Laguna. Since the Philippines' colonial period, the region has served as home to some of the most important Philippine historical figures, including the Philippines' national hero, José Rizal, who was born in Calamba.

Etymology
The name of the region is an acronym of its five component provinces: Cavite, Laguna, Batangas, Rizal and Quezon.

History

On June 5, 1901, a convention was called on whether or not the province of Manila should annex the province of Morong, which was found to be unable to be self-sufficient as a province. Eventually, on June 11, Act No. 137 of the First Philippine Commission abolished Morong and created a new province, named after the Philippines' national hero, Jose Rizal, who, coincidentally, was a native of Laguna. The new province comprised 29 municipalities, 17 from Manila and 12 from Morong. In 1902, Macario Sakay, a veteran Katipunan member, established the Tagalog Republic in the mountains of Rizal. Ultimately, Sakay's Tagalog Republic ended in 1906 when he and his men were betrayed under the guise of holding a national assembly aimed at the self-determination of the Filipino people.

On September 7, 1946, the Third Philippine Republic enacted Republic Act No. 14, which renamed the province of Tayabas to Quezon, in honor of Manuel Quezon. Quezon was the second President of the Philippines and a native of Baler (now part of Aurora). In 1951, the northern part of Quezon became the sub-province Aurora, named after Quezon's wife.

On September 24, 1972, President Ferdinand Marcos enacted Presidential Decree No. 1, which organized the provinces into 11 regions as part of Marcos' Integrated Reorganization Plan. The IRP created Region IV, known as the Southern Tagalog region, and was the largest region in the Philippines. At this time, Region IV consisted of Batangas, Cavite, Laguna, Marinduque, Oriental Mindoro, Occidental Mindoro, Quezon, Rizal, Romblon, and Palawan. In 1979, Aurora formally became a province independent of Quezon and was also included in Region IV.

On May 17, 2002, President Gloria Macapagal Arroyo signed Executive Order No. 103, which reorganized the Southern Tagalog region. Due to its size, Region IV was split into two separate regions, Region IV-A (Calabarzon) and Region IV-B (Mimaropa). Aurora was transferred to Region III, Central Luzon. The next year, Arroyo signed Executive Order No. 246, which declared Calamba as the regional center of the region.

Geography

The region itself is relatively flat, but also consists of coastal areas and highlands. It is bordered by Manila Bay in the west, Metro Manila, Bulacan, and Aurora in the north, Lamon Bay and Bicol in the east, and the Isla Verde Passage in the south. Each province in the region is composed of different environments, ranging from low coastal areas to rugged mountainous ones.

Cavite is characterized by rolling hinterlands punctured by hills, with a shoreline bordering Manila Bay and a rugged portion bordering Batangas near Mount Pico de Loro. Tagaytay is located in Cavite, bordering Alfonso, Silang, Calamba, and Santa Rosa. Mount Sungay is the highest peak in the province and can be found in Tagaytay. There are nine islands in Cavite, most notable of which is the island of Corregidor. Historically a site of great strategic importance, Corregidor is found at the mouth of Manila Bay and is under the jurisdiction of Cavite City.

Laguna has rugged terrain, with narrow plains near the shores of Laguna de Bay and mountainous ranges further inland. Laguna de Bay is the largest lake in the Philippines, and is named after the town of Bay. Laguna is also home to Mount Makiling, a dormant volcano near Los Baños reputed for its mystical properties. There are also a lot of hot springs near the Makiling area, especially in San Pablo. Another famous landmark in Laguna are the Pagsanjan Falls, in Cavinti. The water from the Pagsanjan Falls comes from the Bumbungan River. Mount Banahaw borders Laguna and Quezon, and is similarly considered to be a holy mountain like Makiling.

The Batangas area is mostly elevated, with small low flat lands and scattered mountain areas. Batangas is also home to the Taal Volcano, a complex volcano and one of the 16 Decade Volcanoes. The Taal Volcano is situated within Taal Lake, making Taal a third-order island, and possibly one of the largest in the world. Other islands in Batangas are Verde Island, near the Isla Verde Passage, and Fortune Island in Nasugbu. Batangas borders Cavite via Mount Pico de Loro, known for the views that could be found in its summit. Mount Macolod and Mount Batulao can also be found in Batangas.

Rizal is situated north of Laguna de Bay, and consists of a mixture of valleys and mountain ranges, with flat low-lying areas in the western portion of the province near Manila. The eastern portion of Rizal has hills and ridges which form part of the Sierra Madre range. Talim Island, the largest island in Laguna de Bay, is under the jurisdiction of the province of Rizal.

Quezon province is mountainous, with few plains and swamps, and the tail-end of the Sierra Madre running through it. Quezon is a narrow province, with the Tayabas Isthmus comprising the southern part of the province and connecting it to the Bicol Peninsula. The southern part also consists of the Bondoc Peninsula, sandwiched between the Tayabas Bay and Ragay Gulf. The largest islands in Quezon are the Alabat and Polillo islands, which are both located in Lamon Bay, connecting to Calauag Bay of the town of Calauag. Laguna shares a border with Quezon via Mount Banahaw.

Administrative divisions

Provinces

Calabarzon comprises five provinces, 1 highly urbanized city, 20 component cities and 4,019 barangays.

Cities

Calabarzon has 21 cities (21 component cities and the highly urbanized city of Lucena) in total, making it the region with the most cities amongst the Luzon regions. Antipolo is the most populous city in the region, as well as the 6th most populous city of the whole Philippines, while Bacoor and San Pedro is the most densely populated cities in the whole region. A large section of Calabarzon is considered part of the Greater Manila Area; while Batangas City is the center of the Batangas metropolitan area. The region has a gross regional product of ₱1.65 trillion (at current prices), which accounts for 17% of the national GDP.

On August 7, 2000, the municipality of Los Baños, Laguna, was declared as a "Special Science and Nature City of the Philippines" through Presidential Proclamation No. 349 in recognition of its importance as a center for science and technology, being home to many prestigious educational, environmental and research institutions. This proclamation does not convert the municipality to a city or give it corporate powers that are accorded to other cities.

Notes

Demographics

Calabarzon has a population of 16.1 million people, the largest of all the regions of the Philippines. The population growth rate between 2000 and 2010 of 3.07% decreased from the growth rate between 1990 and 2000 of 3.91%, a trend which coincided with the rest of the nation. Life expectancy in Calabarzon is 68.9 years for men and 75.2 years for women. There are an estimated 356,000 Overseas Filipino Workers originating from Calabarzon.

A vast majority of people living in Calabarzon are Tagalogs. It is estimated that around 5.8 million Tagalogs live in Region IV-A. Taal, in particular, is considered the "Heartland of Tagalog Culture" and is currently the "center" of the Tagalog culture and people. Calabarzon is also home to a sizable number of people with Chinese and Spanish ancestry on account of Chinese immigration and Spanish colonization, respectively. Because of the large majority of Tagalog natives, the majority of people living in Calabarzon speak the Tagalog language. Filipino, being a version of Tagalog, is predominant in the region, which is spoken as a lingua franca of Tagalog speakers of different dialects. English is also used in Calabarzon. In Cavite, Chavacano, a creole language, was once commonly spoken; however, its usage is now in steep decline, and it is now only spoken by a handful of elderly residents in the province.

The large majority of the population of Calabarzon is a part of the Catholic Church, which accounts for 80% of the national population. Other Christian denominations present in the region are the Iglesia ni Cristo, the Philippine Independent Church and the Seventh-day Adventist Church. There are also Muslims living in Calabarzon, although they are in the minority.

Economy

Calabarzon is the third largest contributor to the national GDP, accounting for 17% of the gross domestic product. The region boasts a 2.1% inflation rate, lower than the national average of 3%. The region has a 9.2% unemployment rate which is higher than the national average of 7%. Calabarzon, much like the rest of the country, is caught in the middle of being an industrial and an agricultural economy.

Due to the region's proximity to Metro Manila, a large amount of urbanization has taken place over the years. Cavite and Laguna in particular are sites of manufacturing and high-tech industries, with companies like Intel and Panasonic setting up plants in the region. Santa Rosa, Laguna, is home to a host of semi-conductor and automotive companies such as Amkor and Toyota, while General Trias is home to Cavite's largest economic development zone, the PEC Industrial Park.

The region still has a large agricultural base. As of 2002, the region had 282,700 farms, covering , or 36.3% of the region's total land area. Cavite alone has almost  of agricultural land. Laguna is home to the International Rice Research Institute, which can be found within the University of the Philippines Los Baños, whose main goal is to find sustainable ways to help rice farmers. Batangas, meanwhile, is home to a large pineapple and coconut industry, which is used to make Barong Tagalogs and lambanog. Quezon is the country's leader in coconut products such as coconut oil and copra. Quezon's towns such as Tayabas City, Mauban and Infanta are also known producers of commercialized native liqueurs such as lambanog and tuba. Rizal is known for its piggeries. Region IV-A's agricultural base, however, is slowly decreasing. Due to their proximity to large bodies of water, Laguna and Batangas also have sizable fishing industries. Taal Lake is a large source of fresh water fishes for the country.

Tourism

Due to the region's history and natural resources, tourism plays a major role in the regional economy. Cavite and Laguna are homes to various historical sites, such as the Rizal Shrine in Calamba, and the Aguinaldo Shrine in Kawit. San Pablo is famous for its seven lakes, Pagsanjan for its majestic waterfalls and both Taal Lake and the historic Taal town in Batangas. Tayabas is known as the City of Festivals, Rest and Recreation Destination of Quezon and famous for lambanog.

The Minor Basilica of Saint Michael Archangel is the religious testaments of the Tayabenses and declared as National Cultural Treasures of the Philippines, the Casa Comunidad de Tayabas, the former office of the then President Manuel Luis Quezon and the place where Hermano Pule was sentenced to death, and the Malagonlong Bridge and the 9 other century-old Spanish arch type and National Cultural Treasure bridges. Local festivals include the Taytsinoy Festival, Mayohan Festival, Pa'yas Festival Hagisan Festival, Baliskog Festival, Angel Festival, Aguyod Festival and the Turumba Festival every Holy Week.

Lucban is most famous for its annual Pahiyas Festival or locally known as Pahiyas, an event not only visited by local tourists but also by international tourists as well. Devotees and pilgrims also visit Lucban's Kamay ni Hesus Shrine, a 50-foot statue of the Ascending Christ on top of a hill. Batangas is also famous for its scenic beaches in Nasugbu and Calatagan. Antipolo is another major tourist spot, found in Rizal. The region is also home to a multitude of baroque churches.

Infrastructure

Roads and Bridges
The Laguna Lake Highway, a joint project of DPWH NCR and Region IV-A, is the widening/rehabilitation at Taytay, Rizal segment, a 3.34-kilometer road.

Currently, there are two more bridges being built - Barkadahan Bridge and Napindan Bridge - which will provide additional 2 lanes crossing over Manggahan Floodway and Pasig River, respectively.

References

External links 
 
 
 

 
Regions of the Philippines
Luzon